Ronald William Brown  (7 September 1921 – 27 July 2002) was a British Labour Party politician.  He was the younger brother of George Brown, interim Leader of the Labour Party in 1963.

Brown was educated in South London and at Borough Polytechnic.  He served as a councillor on Camberwell Borough Council and was leader of the council. He was the first leader of the London Borough of Southwark from 1964, on which he served as an alderman.

Brown was first elected as Member of Parliament (MP) for Shoreditch and Finsbury at the 1964 general election. In 1966 he was challenged for his seat by the fascist Oswald Mosley (standing under the Union Movement), who had been interned without trial during the Second World War. Following boundary changes for the February 1974 election, Brown was elected for Hackney South and Shoreditch. After 1979 he was sometimes confused with the new Scottish Labour MP Ron Brown.

In 1981, Brown was among a number of Labour MPs who defected to the Social Democratic Party (his brother also indicated his support and later joined). He lost his seat at the 1983 general election, polling 18% of the vote behind the Labour candidate Brian Sedgemore (who defected to the Liberal Democrats himself in 2005). Brown died in 2002 aged 80.

References

Times Guide to the House of Commons, 1966 & 1983

External links 
 

1921 births
2002 deaths
Furniture, Timber and Allied Trades Union
Labour Party (UK) MPs for English constituencies
Hackney Members of Parliament
Social Democratic Party (UK) MPs for English constituencies
Councillors in Greater London
Councillors in the London Borough of Southwark
UK MPs 1964–1966
UK MPs 1966–1970
UK MPs 1970–1974
UK MPs 1974
UK MPs 1974–1979
UK MPs 1979–1983
Labour Party (UK) MEPs
MEPs for the United Kingdom 1973–1979
Alumni of London South Bank University